ePSXe (enhanced PSX emulator) is a PlayStation video game console emulator for x86-based PC hardware with Microsoft Windows and Linux, as well as devices running Android. It was written by three authors, using the aliases calb, _Demo_ and Galtor. ePSXe is closed source with the exception of the application programming interface (API) for its plug-ins.

Development 
For half a year, ePSXe was developed in private, with part of this initial development being carried out by _Demo_, previously known for his work on the Super Nintendo emulator ZSNES. When released on October 14, 2000, ePSXe was a revolution in the Playstation emulation scene, boasting higher compatibility and performance than other emulators of the system at the time.

After ePSXe 1.6.0 was released on August 5, 2003, its development seemed to halt, with speculation that the source code had been lost due to a hard disk failure. However, on April 5, 2008, the developers of ePSXe made a public statement revealing that in the summer of 2007, they had decided to continue development of the emulator, due to encouragement from users. On May 24, 2008, ePSXe version 1.7.0 was released.

After another hiatus, the developers came back on August 30, 2012, announcing the release of ePSXe for Android, as well as stating that ePSXe for Windows was in testing of version 1.8.0. This version was released on November 9, 2012.

Features 
ePSXe was one of the early emulators to make use of plug-ins to emulate GPU, SPU (sound), and CD-ROM drive functions, a model first established in PSEmu Pro. Games can be loaded from the computer's CD drive or from one of many types of CD images directly from the user's hard drive.

A patching feature allows the user to apply game patches. Games that do not necessarily run properly, or even start at all, can be fixed and played via the use of ePSXe patch files in .ppf format. Not all games prone to bugs have ppf patches written for them.

Until version 1.9.25, ePSXe could only function with an image of an official Sony PlayStation BIOS. Since the various PlayStation BIOS images are copyrighted by Sony, it is illegal to distribute them. For this reason, ePSXe does not come bundled with any of the PlayStation BIOS images, requiring the user to provide one for the emulator. Version 1.9.25 added HLE BIOS support, allowing it to mimic the effect of the PlayStation's BIOS, although compatibility is currently lower than an official BIOS.

Plug-ins 
 GPU: Most GPU plug-ins run with either Direct3D, OpenGL, or the Glide API, and are available as freeware or open-source. Many GPU plugins require game-specific hacks to run games.
 SPU: The SPU plug-ins can emulate everything from music to sound effects, with varying degrees of success depending on the plug-in settings, and of course the plug-in being used
 CD-ROM: ePSXe comes with a core CD-ROM plug-in, but many others are available for freeware download and many can emulate up to seven different types of read modes
 Input: The core plug-in is sufficient, but there are others that allow for more functionality.

Compatibility 
ePSXe is able to run most PlayStation games somewhat accurately. Few games run flawlessly without extensive configuration and trial by error testing. In the case that a game does not run successfully, patches written for the game in question can be used, though few games have patches available.

Releases

For PC

For Android

Reception 
Retro Gamer called ePSXe "the best free PlayStation emulator". Techtree stated "ePSXe is the best free PlayStation emulator".

Pcnexus says "the easiest PS1 emulator for android with downloadable cheat codes and great game compatibilty with PS1 roms".

See also 

 Mednafen
 bleem!
 PCSX
 List of video game emulators

References

External links

Download version 2.0.5 for Windows
Download version 2.0.5 for Linux
ePSXe for Android website

Android emulation software
Linux emulation software
PlayStation emulators
Windows emulation software
Proprietary video game console emulators